The Latvia women's national volleyball team represents Latvia in international women's volleyball competitions and friendly matches. After the dissolution of the Soviet Union the team first competed on the highest level under its own flag at the 1993 European Championship, finishing in ninth place.

Results

World Championship
 1998 — did not qualify
 2002 to 2022 — did not qualify

European Championship
 1993 — 9th place
 1995 — 9th place
 1997 — 8th place
 1999 — did not compete
 2001 — did not compete
 2003 — did not compete
 2005 — did not compete
 2007 — did not compete
 2009 — did not compete
 2011 — did not compete
 2013 — did not qualify
 2015 — did not qualify
 2017 — did not qualify
 2019 — did not qualify
 2021 — did not qualify
 2023 — did not qualify

References

Volleyball
National women's volleyball teams
Women's sport in Latvia
Volleyball in Latvia